Credit Bank of Moscow is a Russian bank founded in 1992 and operating in Moscow and Moscow Oblast. 

In 2008-2015, the Moscow Credit Bank raised from 66 to 12 place by assets in Russian bank rating. Its funds increased 20 times and achieved 115 billion rubles. In 2016, it got into the top-10 in terms of leading Russian banks.

As of September 2017 Credit Bank of Moscow is ranked 9th among Russian banks by assets.  Now the Moscow Credit Bank is the biggest private regional bank in Russia. It's in the top of banks of major systemic importance. 

Credit Bank of Moscow is owned by Roman Avdeev, the head of Ingrad real estate development company and Rossium concern. Before 2012, Avdeev was the only beneficiary of the Moscow Credit Bank. He bought the bank in 1994. Now he controls 55,73% of stocks. 

Avdeev was the head of the international finance attraction department and a president of the Moscow Credit Bank. At the end of 2008, Avdeev stepped down, but remained a member of the Supervisory Council. In 2012, former Colorado governor Bill Owens joined the board and became its chair in 2013.

At the end of 2020, CBM acted as an organizer of a €5.775 billion loan for Trafigura Group in its deal to acquire a 10% stake in Rosneft's Vostok Oil arctic project.

In March 2021, CBM bought the industrial commercial bank "Koltso Urala" (Ring of the Urals), which was controlled by the Ural Mining and Metallurgical Company. The deal is valued at 5.7 billion rubles (about $770 million). The Bank will continue to serve the activities of the UMMC.

In the Forbes World Best Banks list, published in April 2021, Moscow Credit Bank ranks second among Russian banks.

In July 2021, S&P upgraded MKB's credit rating from BB- to BB with a stable outlook. “CBM has demonstrated the stability of its business in an unstable market situation, as evidenced by its indicators of loan losses and indicators of asset quality,” the agency said in a statement.

Sanctions 
On February 24, 2022, US President Joe Biden announced sanctions on Russian banks, including the Credit Bank of Moscow, in response to the 2022 Russian invasion of Ukraine. In December 2022 the EU also sanctioned the Credit Bank of Moscow in relation to the invasion.

References

External links
 

Banks of Russia
Companies based in Moscow
Banks established in 1992
Companies listed on the Moscow Exchange

Russian entities subject to the U.S. Department of the Treasury sanctions